The 2007 Tour de Georgia was a seven-stage professional bicycle race held from April 16 through April 22, 2007 across the state of Georgia and into Tennessee. The race was part of the 2007 USA Cycling Pro Tour. The race was the highest ranked event of the 2006–2007 UCI America Tour.

The 2007 race began in Peachtree City, and crossed parts of north Georgia, including climbing stages that went to Lookout Mountain, Tennessee and Brasstown Bald, the highest point of elevation in Georgia. The final stage was a circuit in the streets of Atlanta, and ended at Centennial Olympic Park.

Stages

Final standings

General classification

Mountains classification

Points classification
Also known as the Sprint classification.

Team classification

References
 2007 Tour de Georgia Official Site
 Tour de Georgia April 16-22, 2007 at Cycling News

2007 in road cycling
2007 in American sports
Tour de Georgia